Richard Allen Penry (November 18, 1948 – May 9, 1994) was a United States Army soldier and a recipient of the United States military's highest decoration—the Medal of Honor—for his actions in the Vietnam War.

Biography
Born in Petaluma, California, Penry joined the Army from Oakland, California in March 1969, and by January 31, 1970, was serving as a Sergeant in Company C, 4th Battalion, 12th Infantry Regiment, 199th Infantry Brigade. On that day, in Binh Tuy Province of the Republic of Vietnam, his unit came under an intense enemy attack. After the company commander was wounded, Penry helped organize the defense of the area and repeatedly exposed himself to enemy fire to retrieve supplies and return fire. He was honorably discharged from the Army in March 1971. 

Penry died at age 45 and was buried in Cypress Hill Memorial Park in Petaluma. Penry has two namesakes in his hometown: a park that was renamed in his honor, and a small military museum, the Sgt. Richard Penry Medal of Honor Memorial Military Museum, where his Medal of Honor is displayed.

Medal of Honor citation

Awards and decorations

See also

List of Medal of Honor recipients
List of Medal of Honor recipients for the Vietnam War

Sources

References

1948 births
1994 deaths
People from Petaluma, California
United States Army personnel of the Vietnam War
United States Army Medal of Honor recipients
Military personnel from California
Recipients of the Distinguished Service Cross (United States)
United States Army soldiers
Recipients of the Air Medal
Vietnam War recipients of the Medal of Honor